Raymond "Mundo" Earwood (October 13, 1952 – April 21, 2014) was an American country music singer-songwriter. Earwood's eponymous debut album was released by Excelsior Records in 1981. His most successful single, "Things I'd Do for You", reached the Top 20 on the Billboard Hot Country Songs chart in 1978. For a time, he also recorded as Mundo Ray.

Biography
Earwood was born in Del Rio, Texas. After graduating high school in Corpus Christi, he enrolled in San Jacinto Junior College but soon moved to Houston where he hired a band, and began playing for $8 at any venue that would book him. Earwood released several records on a small Houston label. His manager took him to Nashville to cut his first major national release, "Behind Blue Eyes", which was initially released on Earwood's own label, Raywood, and eventually sold to the Royal American label, where it spent eight weeks at #1 on the Houston radio charts, six months total on the Houston charts, and a long tenure on the national charts.

He went on to release "Let's Hear it for Loneliness", "Lonesome Is a Cowboy" and "I Can Give You Love". In 1978, "Things I'd Do For You" soared to #18 on the Billboard country chart. This period also produced "Fooled Around and Fell in Love", "Angelene", and "My Heart is Not My Own". During his career, he appeared on the Billboard charts 23 times.

Mundo Earwood was diagnosed with pancreatic cancer and a fibrous histiocytoma tumor in 2013, which later led to his death on April 21, 2014 at the age of 61.

Discography

Albums

Singles

Notes
A^ "Angela" also peaked at No. 40 on the RPM Country Tracks chart in Canada.

References

1952 births
2014 deaths
People from Del Rio, Texas
American country singer-songwriters
American male singer-songwriters
Singer-songwriters from Texas
Deaths from pancreatic cancer
Deaths from cancer in Texas
Country musicians from Texas